The American Association of Geographers (AAG) is a non-profit scientific and educational society aimed at advancing the understanding, study, and importance of geography and related fields. Its headquarters is located in Washington, D.C. The organization was founded on December 29, 1904, in Philadelphia, as the Association of American Geographers, with the American Society of Professional Geographers later amalgamating into it in December 1948 in Madison, Wisconsin. As of 2020, the association has more than 10,000 members, from nearly 100 countries. AAG members are geographers and related professionals who work in the public, private, and academic sectors.

In 2016, AAG President Dr. Sarah Witham Bednarz announced in the AAG Newsletter: "Effective January 1, 2016, the AAG will begin to operate under the name "American Association of Geographers", rather than "Association of American Geographers... in an effort to re-think our systems of representation to acknowledge our growing internationalism." Spearheaded under the presidency of geography professor Eric Sheppard (UCLA, formerly University of Minnesota), the name change reflects the US-based organization's diversity and inclusion of non-American members and participants.

Publications 
The Annals of the American Association of Geographers and The Professional Geographer are the association's flagship journals. Additional journals published by the organization include the AAG Review of Books, GeoHumanities, and African Geographical Review. The AAG also publishes a monthly newsletter that contains reflections on programs and issues of concern in society of a geographic nature, a jobs column, and accomplishments and innovations of AAG members. The AAG additionally publishes the Guide to Geography Programs in the Americas, a description of programs in higher education in North and South America that offer a geography degree, a geography certificate program, and/or geography courses. Another publication is Earth Interactions.

Specialty groups 
The AAG has more than 80 specialty or affinity groups, voluntary associations of AAG members who share interests in regions or topics. Specialty groups have long provided a way for geographers with specific interests to collaborate and communicate, including organizing and sponsoring sessions at the annual meeting as well as granting awards to their members. The AAG also offers Knowledge Communities, a set of online tools for collaboration.

Annual meetings 
Since its founding in 1904, the AAG has held an annual meeting for the geography community. In recent years, this conference has attracted between 7,000 and 9,000 attendees. The annual meeting offers upwards of 4,000 papers and presentations on topics as diverse as soil moisture, climate change, population dynamics, political instability, sustainable agriculture, natural hazards, urban landscapes, geography and militarism, and technologies such as geographic information systems. Hands-on workshops on methods and technological tools are an important part of these meetings. The annual meetings also offer an extensive exhibit hall featuring publishers, technology companies, universities, businesses, and nonprofit organizations. Field trips are offered in the diverse locations that these conferences are held.

The Annual Meetings are held in February, March, or April each year for four to five days. In recent years, the meetings have been held virtually (2020, 2021, and 2022) and in person in DC (2019), New Orleans (2018), Boston (2017), San Francisco (2016), Chicago (2015), Tampa (2014), Los Angeles (2013), New York (2012), and Seattle (2011).

The AAG also sponsors fall meetings based within each regional divisions of the organization. These regional divisions are groupings of several states in the United States, and include, Pacific Coast, Great Plains/Rocky Mountains, Southwest, West Lakes, East Lakes, Southeast, Mid-Atlantic, Middle States, and New England/St. Lawrence Valley.

Partnerships 
To effectively advance geography in society requires partnerships. The AAG has a long history of fruitful partnerships with government agencies, nonprofit organizations, and private industry. These include the National Council for Geographic Education, the United States Geological Survey, the National Institutes of Health, the American Geosciences Institute and others.

Awards
The James R. Anderson Medal of Honor (the Anderson Medal) is awarded by the AAG Applied Geography Specialty Group to recognise highly distinguished service to the profession of geography in the field of industry, government, literature, education, research, service to the profession, or public service. It is named for James R. Anderson, the third chief geographer of the U.S. Geological Survey.

The G. K. Gilbert Award for Excellence in Geomorphological Research (not to be confused with the G. K. Gilbert Award given by the Geological Society of America), is presented to the author(s) of a single significant contribution to the published research literature in geomorphology.

AAG also issues an annual award to a university geography program that is helping advance the field of geography.

It also has a series of awards for significant books about geography, the John Brinckerhoff Jackson Prize, the AAG Globe Book Award for Public Understanding of Geography, and the AAG Meridian Book Award for Outstanding Scholarly Work in Geography.

Presidents  

†died during his tenure

See also 

 Areography (geography of Mars)
 Biogeography
 Cartography
 Climatology
 Cultural geography
 Demography
 Development geography
 Economic geography
 Gamma Theta Upsilon
 Geodesy
 Geographic Information Science
 Geographic Information Systems
 Geographical space
 Geography
 Geomatics
 Geomorphology
 Geovisualization
 Glaciology
 Global Positioning System
 Health geography
 Historical Geography
 Hydrology
 Landscape ecology
 National Council for Geographic Education
 Oceanography
 Palaeogeography
 Pedology
 Planetary Science
 Remote sensing
 Time geography
 Transportation geography
 Urban geography

References

Notes

Further reading

External links 

 
 AAG YouTube Channel
 AAG Knowledge Communities
 National Council for Geographic Education
 Archives of the AAG held at the AGS Library, UW Milwaukee

 
1904 establishments in Pennsylvania
Geographic societies
Scientific societies based in the United States
Organizations established in 1904
Professional associations based in the United States
Non-profit organizations based in Washington, D.C.
Geographic data and information organizations in the United States